Cannae is a village in Italy.

Cannae may also refer to:

 Battle of Cannae (216 BC) a battle in the Punic Wars of Rome and Carthage famed for the Cannae Tactic of Hannibal
 Battle of Cannae (1018) a battle of the Byzantine Empire
 Cannae (band) U.S. metalcore band
 Cannae drive, a type of reactionless spacecraft drive

See also
 Chennai (formerly Madras), the capital of Tamil Nadu, India
 Canae, an ancient city on the island of Argennusa
 Canna (disambiguation)